Tarow Barney (born June 8, 1994) is an American football defensive tackle who is currently a free agent. He played college football for the Penn State Nittany Lions of the Big Ten.

Early life
Barney only played one season of high school football for head coach Ed Pilcher at Bainbridge High School. In his lone season he was an honorable-mention all-region selection as a senior . Made 55 tackles with five sacks in his final year of high school.

References

1994 births
Living people
Northwest Mississippi Rangers football players
Penn State Nittany Lions football players
American football defensive tackles